The men's lightweight competition of the boxing events at the 2018 Mediterranean Games in Tarragona, Spain, was held between June 25 and 30 at the Torredembarra Pavilion.

Like all Mediterranean Games boxing events, the competition was a straight single-elimination tournament. Both semifinal losers were awarded bronze medals, so no boxers competed again after their first loss.

Schedule
All times are Central European Summer Time (UTC+2).

Results

Bracket

References

Boxing at the 2018 Mediterranean Games